Ivan Jurisic may refer to:
Ivan Jurišić (footballer, born 1956)
Ivan Jurisic (footballer, born 1970s)